The Open Bay Islands are located in South Westland, off the south-west coast of the South Island of New Zealand. They consist of two main islands, Taumaka and Popotai, plus several smaller islets and rocks.

Wildlife
The Open Bay Islands support several endemic species, including a terrestrial leech (Hirudobdella antipodum), an undescribed gecko species (aff. Hoplodactylus granulatus), and a skink (Oligosoma taumakae). In 2010 the skink was discovered on the Barn Islands, two rock stacks near Haast, as well as a terrestrial leech likely to be Hirudobdella antipodum; the gecko, however, has only ever been recorded from Taumaka Island, and only 15 have been seen.

Taumaka Island has been identified as an Important Bird Area by BirdLife International because it is a breeding site for Fiordland penguins. New Zealand fur seals currently numbering in the thousands have recolonized the islands following the end of commercial sealing. Hector's dolphins and bottlenose dolphins (occasional) are present at Jackson Bay, and migratory southern right and humpback whales are also present.  Great white sharks have also been confirmed in the area.

Wekas
Although introduced mammals are not known ever to have reached the Open Bay Islands, the introduction of weka (a native flightless rail, Gallirallus australis) from the South Island in the early 1900s has had an adverse impact on the flora and fauna of the islands.  The Department of Conservation have recommended to the Minister of Conservation that weka should be removed from the islands. The Trust which governs the island has agreed to removal on the condition that they are not killed.

Castaways
The sealer , brought a ten-man sealing gang from Sydney to the islands. The men had very basic provisions: some food, salt, an axe, an adze, and a cooper's drawing knife. The ship, which left the islands on 16 February 1810, was not seen again, and the sealing gang was assumed to have been lost with the ship. After years of considerable hardship, they finally saw a ship, the Governor Bligh, and attracted its attention. They were picked up and arrived back in Sydney on 15 December 1813.

The men's fate has been turned into a song, Davy Low'ston, that tells their ordeal.

See also

 Islands of New Zealand
 List of islands
 Desert island

References

External links
 Recording of the sealers' song
 Critters of Taumaka on the blog of Museum of New Zealand Te Papa Tongarewa 
 Birdlife of Taumaka on the blog of Museum of New Zealand Te Papa Tongarewa

Uninhabited islands of New Zealand
Westland District
Important Bird Areas of New Zealand
Landforms of the West Coast, New Zealand
Archipelagoes of New Zealand
Archipelagoes of the Pacific Ocean